LaRoche is a ghost town in Stanley County, in the U.S. state of South Dakota.

History
The community has the name of Joe La Roche, a cattleman. A post office called La Roche was established in 1916, and remained in operation until 1942.

References

Ghost towns in South Dakota
Geography of Stanley County, South Dakota